Alfred A. Cave, Ph.D., D. Litt. ( February 8, 1935 - September 8, 2019) was an American professor, historian, and author. He is a Professor Emeritus of History at the University of Toledo, specializing in the ethnohistory of Colonial America, Native Americans, and the Jacksonian era.

His writing primarily focuses on ethnic conflict and accommodation in Colonial America.  He is best known for the history, The Pequot War, which The New England Quarterly referred to as the "definitive study" of the Pequot War of 1636-8. Cave was recognized as a "distinguished teacher" at the University of Utah. When he taught at the University of Toledo, he was honored with an Outstanding Research Award from the institution. In 2012, the Ohio Academy of History honored him with the Distinguished Historian Award. In 2015, he was selected to receive the Distinguished Alumnus Award from the University of Florida.

Personal background 
Alfred Alexander Cave was born on February 8, 1935, in Albuquerque, New Mexico. He attended Linfield College, graduating magna cum laude with a Bachelor's degree in 1957. He earned a Master's degree in 1959 and his Ph.D. in 1961, both from the University of Florida.

Academic career 
Cave taught at four universities: the City College of New York, the University of Utah, the University of Florida, and the University of Toledo.  He served as the Director of the Honors College and Dean of the College of Humanities at the University of Utah.

From 1973 to 1990, he served as the Dean of the College of Arts and Sciences at the University of Toledo.  Returning to full-time teaching and research, he served as Professor of History at Toledo until 2007 and is now Professor Emeritus of History.  He remains active in research and publication.

Honors and awards
 Distinguished Teaching Award, University of Utah – 1967
1990, Salford University awarded him with an honorary Doctorate of Letters.
 1997, Outstanding Research Award, University of Toledo 
 2012, Distinguished Historian Award, Ohio Academy of History
 2015, Distinguished Alumnus Award, University of Florida.

Published works 
Selected articles and case studies
 
 
 
 
 
 
 Cave, Alfred A.; and Dan Stone (ed.) (2008). "Genocide in the Americas", The Historiography of Genocide, Palgrave Macmillan, pp 273–295. 
 

Books
 Cave, Alfred A. (1964). Jacksonian Democracy and the Historians, University Press of Florida, 86 pages. 
 Cave, Alfred A. (1969). American Civilization: A Documentary History, Kendall/Hunt Publishing, 367 pages. 
 Cave, Alfred A. (1969). An American Conservative in the Age of Jackson: The Political and Social Thought of Calvin Colton, Texas Christian University Press, 69 pages.  
 Cave, Alfred A. (1996). The Pequot War, University of Massachusetts Press, 219 pages. 
 Cave, Alfred A. (2004). The French and Indian War, Greenwood Press, 175 pages. 
 Cave, Alfred A. (2006). Prophets of the Great Spirit: Native American Revitalization Movements in Eastern North America, University of Nebraska Press, 328 pages. 
 Cave, Alfred A. (2013). Lethal Encounters: Englishmen and Indians in Colonial Virginia, University of Nebraska Press, 216 pages. 
 Cave, Alfred A. (2014). The Fraudulent Verses: the Death of a Theocracy, (Science Fiction Novel), Amazon Kindle, 203 pages. 
 Cave, Alfred A. (2017). Sharp Knife: Andrew Jackson and the American Indians, Praeger, 341 pages.

References 

1935 births
2019 deaths
20th-century American historians
20th-century American male writers
American male non-fiction writers
Deaths from Parkinson's disease
University of Utah faculty
University of Toledo faculty
City College of New York faculty
University of Florida alumni
Linfield University alumni
Writers from Albuquerque, New Mexico